Samuel Kwofie is a former Ghanaian politician and a member of the Second Parliament of the Fourth Republic representing the Ahanta West constituency in the Western Region of Ghana.

Early life 
Samuel was born at Ahanta West in the Western Region of Ghana.

Politics 
Samuel was first elected into Parliament on the ticket of the New Patriotic Party for the Ahanta West Constituency in the Western Region of Ghana. During the December 1996 Ghanaian general elections. He defeated Isaac K. Brace of the People's National Congress, Francis M.Fynn of the National Democratic Congress, Kaku Aluade of the Convention People's Party and Moses Andoh of the National Congress Party. He was defeated by Samuel Johnfiah during his Party Parliamentary Primary Elections.

References 

New Patriotic Party politicians
People from Western Region (Ghana)
21st-century Ghanaian politicians
Ghanaian MPs 1997–2001
Living people
Year of birth missing (living people)